The Claw is a 1927 American silent film produced by Carl Laemmle and distributed by Universal Pictures. It was directed by Sidney Olcott with Norman Kerry and Claire Windsor in the leading roles.

Cast
Norman Kerry - Maurice Stair
Claire Windsor - Deirdre Saurin
Arthur Edmund Carewe - Maj. Anthony Kinsella
Tom Guise - Marquis de Stair
Helene Sullivan - Judy Saurin
Nelson McDowell - Scout MacBourney
Larry Steers - Captain Rockwood
J. Gordon Russell - wagon driver
Maryta Bonilla - Saba Rockwood
Jacques d'Auray - Richard Saurin
Pauline Neff - Nonie Valetta
Bertram Johns - Dr Harriatt
Billie Bennett - Mrs Harriatt
Annie Ryan - Mrs MacBourney
Dick Sutherland - Chief Loguenbuela

Preservation status
The film is housed at BFI/ National Film and Television Archive, London.

References

External links

 The Claw website dedicated to Sidney Olcott

1927 films
American silent feature films
Films directed by Sidney Olcott
1927 drama films
Silent American drama films
Universal Pictures films
American black-and-white films
1920s American films